A Decree of Destiny is a 1911 American short silent romantic drama film directed by D. W. Griffith, starring Mary Pickford and featuring Blanche Sweet.

Cast
 Joseph Graybill as Kenneth Marsden
 Marion Sunshine as Edith
 Mary Pickford as Mary
 Clara T. Bracy as The Aunt
 Claire McDowell as A Nun
 Donald Crisp as At the Club / At the Wedding
 Mack Sennett
 Blanche Sweet
 Kate Toncray as At the Wedding

See also
 List of American films of 1911

References

External links

1911 films
1911 romantic drama films
1911 short films
American romantic drama films
American silent short films
American black-and-white films
Biograph Company films
Films directed by D. W. Griffith
1910s American films
Silent romantic drama films
Silent American drama films